"Paper'd Up" is a song by American West Coast hip hop recording artist Snoop Dogg, taken from his six studio album, Paid tha Cost to Be da Bo$$ (2002). It was produced by Fredwreck and features guest appearances by Kokane and Traci Nelson. The beat, drum breaks and harmonies are heavily sampled from Dennis Edward's 1984 Disco Classic "Don't Look Any Further" featuring Siedah Garrett. The oriental vocal sample is from Ofra Haza's song Im Nin'alu. This combination of sample material was already employed by Eric B. & Rakim in 1987 for their dancefloor classic Paid In Full, which was made famous by Coldcut 's Seven Minutes of Madness Remix.

Charts

Weekly charts

References

2002 songs
Snoop Dogg songs
Songs written by Snoop Dogg
Gangsta rap songs
Songs written by Duane Hitchings
Songs written by Dennis Lambert
Songs written by Franne Golde
Songs written by Fredwreck
Song recordings produced by Fredwreck